Edward LeRoy Bowerman (June 2, 1892 – February 17, 1977) was a Canadian politician and farmer. He was elected to the House of Commons of Canada in the 1945 Canadian federal election as a member of the Co-operative Commonwealth Federation for the electoral district of Prince Albert by defeating William Lyon Mackenzie King, then the Prime Minister of Canada, in a huge upset, the last of four times that King was defeated in Canadian politics. After serving as an opposition member in the 20th Canadian Parliament, Bowerman lost his seat to Liberal challenger Francis Heselton Helme in 1949. In honor of Bowerman's service to the provincial government of Saskatchewan, the Parliament named a lake after him in the northern part of the province in 1972.

Bowerman's son, George Reginald Anderson (Ted) Bowerman, was an MLA for Shellbrook from 1967 to 1982 and member of Premier of Saskatchewan Allan Blakeney's cabinet from 1971 to 1982, holding various ministerial positions during the period. Ted was born on the family farm in Shellbrook, Saskatchewan, in 1930, and died in a car accident on December 20, 2007.

Electoral record

External links
 

1892 births
1977 deaths
Co-operative Commonwealth Federation MPs
20th-century Canadian legislators
Members of the House of Commons of Canada from Saskatchewan
Politicians from Toronto
Place of death missing